Paolo Orlandoni (born 12 August 1972) is an Italian former professional footballer who played as a goalkeeper. He is the current goalkeeper coach for Inter Primavera.

Club career
He started his career at Internazionale, then playing on loan for a number of Serie B and Serie C1 teams (A.C. Mantova, AlbinoLeffe, Casarano, A.C. Pro Sesto, A.C. Ancona, U.S. Foggia, A.S. Acireale) until 1998. In July 1998 he was acquired by Reggina, where he was featured as a regular and became instrumental in the club's first promotion ever to the Serie A league in 1999. Orlandoni left Reggina in January 2000 to join Bologna on loan; he then returned to Reggina in September 2000, never playing again for his team, and was subsequently sold to Lazio where he was featured as a second-choice goalkeeper.

From 2001 to 2005 he played for Piacenza, first as backup keeper, then as a regular in his final season with the club. In July 2005 Orlandoni returned to Inter, signing a two-year contract as a third-choice goalkeeper behind Francesco Toldo and Júlio César, making his debut for the Nerazzurri on 14 May 2006 in a league game versus Cagliari. His contract was extended on 29 May 2007, on 26 May 2008, on 12 May 2009, and on 29 June 2010.
On 7 December 2010 Orlandoni made his UEFA Champions League debut, at 38 years of age, in a 0–3 loss to SV Werder Bremen.

On 29 June 2011 he extended his contract again. Just before the last round of 2011–12 Serie A, Orlandoni announced his retirement after the season. However, he still travelled with Inter to Indonesia in May 2012 for a friendly tour.

Career statistics
Source:

Honours
Internazionale
Serie A: 2005–06, 2006–07, 2007–08, 2008–09, 2009–10
Coppa Italia: 2005–06, 2009–10, 2010–11
Supercoppa Italiana: 2005, 2006, 2008, 2010
Champions League: 2009–10
FIFA Club World Cup: 2010

Lazio
Supercoppa Italiana: 2000

References

External links
 

1972 births
Living people
Sportspeople from Bolzano
Italian footballers
Association football goalkeepers
Serie A players
Serie B players
U.C. AlbinoLeffe players
A.C. Ancona players
Calcio Foggia 1920 players
S.S.D. Pro Sesto players
Bologna F.C. 1909 players
Inter Milan players
Reggina 1914 players
S.S. Lazio players
Piacenza Calcio 1919 players
Mantova 1911 players
Fenerbahçe football managers
UEFA Champions League winning players
Fulham F.C. non-playing staff
Italian football managers
Footballers from Trentino-Alto Adige/Südtirol